GTExpress may refer to:

 A store brand operated by Giant Tiger, a Canadian discount retailer
 A bank location operated by Guaranty Trust Bank, a Nigerian multinational bank